The Oklahoma Department of Mental Health and Substance Abuse Services (ODMHSAS) is an agency of the Government of Oklahoma responsible for providing public health services relating to mental illness and substance abuse.

The Department is governed by the Board of Mental Health and Substance Abuse Services, composed of eleven members appointed by the Governor of Oklahoma with the approval of the Oklahoma Senate. The Governor of Oklahoma appoints the Commissioner of Mental Health and Substance Abuse Services to serve as the chief executive officer of the Department. The current Commissioner is Carrie Slatton-Hodges, who was appointed Commissioner in January 2020 by Governor Kevin Stitt.

The Department was established in 1953  by the Mental Health Law of 1953. The law provides that all residents in the state are entitled to care and treatment for mental illness and addiction problems in accordance with appropriate standards of care.

History and function
The Department was established through the Mental Health Law of 1953, although publicly supported services to Oklahomans with mental illness date back to before statehood: the first facility in Oklahoma for the treatment of individuals with mental illness was established by the Cherokee Nation, called the Cherokee Home for the Insane, Deaf, Dumb, and Blind, it was built outside the city of Tahlequah in 1873. Non-Indians with mental illness were sent out of state for treatment to the Oak Lawn Retreat in Jacksonville, Illinois, until a private company, the Oklahoma Sanitarium Company, located in Norman, Oklahoma, began treating the mentally ill on June 15, 1895.  The Department continues to operate a facility at this location today, now called  Griffin Memorial Hospital.

Oklahoma's first state-operated facility for the treatment of   mental illness opened in 1908, in Fort Supply, Oklahoma, and was called the Oklahoma Hospital for the Insane, later renamed Western State Psychiatric Hospital, and now called the Northwest Center for Behavioral Health.  A year later, a second state-operated facility was opened in Vinita, Oklahoma,   called the Eastern Oklahoma Hospital for the Insane, later renamed to the Oklahoma Forensic Center.

On October 31, 1963, President John F. Kennedy signed into law the Community Mental Health Act of 1963, which sparked a major transformation of the public mental health system by shifting resources away from large institutions towards community-based mental health treatment programs.    Soon after the passage of this law, the Department created the Central Oklahoma Community Mental Health Center (COCMHC), which was the first facility of its kind in the United States

Services
The Department provides services through a statewide network of programs. The core of the system is a network of 14 community mental health centers, ten   nonprofit agencies with which the ODMHSAS contracts,  and four   state-operated centers. The state is geographically divided into 17 service areas  each served by a community mental health center (some centers serve multiple areas). Each center is responsible  for providing a comprehensive array of services within its service area. However, individuals seeking services  may choose to seek services anywhere in the state. This service structure is vastly different from the organization's original   model for treatment in the mid-1960s, which was primarily in the form of institutionalization in large state hospitals.

On average, nearly 6,400 Oklahomans were in the state's mental hospitals on any given day.  In FY13, services were provided to approximately 187,000 individuals through the ODMHSAS system, but fewer than 5 percent of required hospital care. Most treatment takes part in mental health and substance abuse outpatient programs, targeted community-based services, prevention efforts and educational initiatives.

For individuals with mental illness, the Department supports a continuum of programs from community-based treatment and case management to acute inpatient care. The ODMHSAS operates two state hospitals for adults and one children's psychiatric hospital: the Oklahoma Forensic Center, Griffin Memorial Hospital, and the Children's Recovery Center. Residential care services for adults with mental illness are provided by 25 separate residential home operators with which the ODMHSAS contracts. The Department operates substance abuse treatment and support programs within state operated facilitates, including CMHCs, and contracts for services with approximately 120 substance abuse treatment providers and 38 separate prevention programs. The Department actively supports prevention programs to reduce the occurrence of substance abuse, prevent suicide, and promote mental health for all Oklahomans. The Oklahoma Bureau of Narcotics and Dangerous Drugs Control serves as the law enforcement arm. The two agencies work together to develop a comprehensive drugs control strategy for the State.

Leadership
The Department is led by Commissioner  Carrie Slatton-Hodges. The Mental Health and Substance Abuse Board is the governing board of the Department. The Board is composed of eleven members appointed by the Governor of Oklahoma with the approval of the Oklahoma Senate. All members of the Board serve seven year terms and no member may have served in the Oklahoma Legislature within five years of their appointment. The Board is required to be composed of individuals meeting the following requirements:

One member must be a physician licensed to practice in Oklahoma and must be appointed from a list of not less than three names submitted to the Governor by the Oklahoma State Medical Association
One member must be a psychiatrist certified as a diplomate of the American Board of Psychiatry and Neurology and must be appointed from a list of not less than three names submitted to the Governor by the Oklahoma State Medical Association
One member must be an attorney licensed to practice in Oklahoma and must be appointed from a list of not less than three names submitted to the Governor by the Oklahoma Bar Association
One member must be a psychologist, licensed to practice in Oklahoma, who must be appointed from a list of not less than three names submitted to the Governor by the Oklahoma State Psychological Association;
Three members, qualified by education and experience in the area of substance abuse recovery, who shall be appointed from a list of not less than ten names submitted to the Governor by a state association of substance abuse recovery programs
 Four members must be citizens of Oklahoma, at least one of whom shall be either a current or former consumer of mental health services.

Facilities

State operated facilities include: 
Carl Albert Community Mental Health Center 
Central Oklahoma Community Mental Health Center 
Children's Recovery Center 
Griffin Memorial Hospital 
Jim Taliaferro Community Mental Health Center
Northwest Center for Behavioral Health 
Oklahoma Country Crisis Center 
Oklahoma County Recovery Unit
Oklahoma Forensic Center 
Rose Rock Recovery Center
Tulsa Center for Behavioral Health

Budget and Staffing
The Department is the sixth largest State agency by annual appropriations from the Oklahoma Legislature. For fiscal year 2012, the Department received $183 million in appropriations from the Legislature, equivalent to 61% of the total budget. $59 million came from fees charged by the Department for its services, or 20% of its budget. The remaining $56 million (19%) comes in the form of grants from the federal Substance Abuse and Mental Health Services Administration.

All fiscal decisions are made and revolve around the availability of funding provided from the state of Oklahoma. The ODMHSAS operates within this political-type framework and therefore must provide evidence to the public and the legislature that the organization focuses on the mission and goals of the agency by effectively delivering the services it has been statutorily commissioned to do. For example, and as evidence of effective service delivery and system transformation, the ODMHSAS service delivery system continues to operate in an increasingly more integrated manner with collaboration and merging of functions across the realms of mental health, substance abuse, and prevention services. Nevertheless, the amount of funding available to the state and allocated to ODMHSAS ultimately determines the effectiveness and the ability to meet the overall goals of the organization. The past several years has set the tone of limited funding to ODMHSAS. Therefore, programs and treatment services within the ODMHSAS service system are constantly being monitored for their efficiency, productivity, and ability to best meet the goals of the organization. Thus, the underlying principles and strategies that drive the decision-making process of the ODMHSAS is to spend every dollar as effectively and efficiently as possible by integrating services where possible, collaborating with other organizations, and innovating the way in which treatment is delivered across the state

The Department, with an annual budget of over $450 million, is one of the largest employers of the State. For fiscal year 2012, the Department was authorized 1,931 full-time employees. It oversees a blended system of state-operated facilities and private contracted providers.

Oklahoma consistently ranks as one of the top states for the number of individuals with mental illness and addiction,[3] but as one of the bottom states as far as behavioral health funding.[4] For example, while the national average of spending per individual for mental health treatment is $120.56, Oklahoma only spends $53.05.  Despite the lack of funding, Oklahoma's mental health system scores among the top states in its delivery of treatment.  For example, the National Alliance for Mental Illness (NAMI) has scored Oklahoma's mental health system as one of the top 6 states, giving it a “B” in NAMI's grading of the states[5]  Noting that lack of funding prevented Oklahoma from receiving an “A,” the NAMI reported that if the Department can successfully implement its state plan through added funding, “it could become a national leader in comprehensive, recovery-oriented mental health care.”[6] Some major reasons for Oklahoma's success is the fact that it has implemented nationally recognized telemedicine system which enables treatment in rural areas where doctors are scarce, as well as its implementation of programs such as its: “systems of care,” “programs of assertive community treatment (PACT),” specialty courts, and others that have stretched funding while improving outcomes. These programs have received several awards at both the state and national level in recognition of their innovation, efficiency, and effectiveness.

See also
Oklahoma State Department of Health
Oklahoma Department of Human Services
Oklahoma Department of Rehabilitation Services
Oklahoma Bureau of Narcotics and Dangerous Drugs Control

References

External links

Mental Disorder Network - Oklahoma City

Mental Health, Department of